Andrew Smith is a Canadian politician and member of the Legislative Assembly of Manitoba, representing the electoral district of Lagimodière as a member of the Progressive Conservative Party of Manitoba. He was first elected in the 2016 election as MLA for Southdale, and re-elected in 2019 as MLA for Lagimodière.

References 

Living people
Politicians from Winnipeg
Progressive Conservative Party of Manitoba MLAs
21st-century Canadian politicians
Year of birth missing (living people)